Thomas John Robert "Tommy" Paul (born May 17, 1997) is an American professional tennis player. 
Paul has a career-high ATP singles ranking of world No. 18, achieved on 13 February 2023, and doubles ranking of No. 97, achieved on 12 September 2022. He won his maiden ATP title at the 2021 Stockholm Open, and reached a major semifinal at the 2023 Australian Open.

Junior career
Tommy Paul was consistently one of the highest ranked juniors of his class. Paul reached a career-high ITF junior rank of No. 3 on December 9, 2015.

Paul reached two junior Grand Slam finals in 2015. He won the 2015 French Open boys' singles title by defeating fellow American Taylor Fritz in the final in three sets. At the same tournament he reached the final in doubles partnering fellow American William Blumberg. He also reached the final at the 2015 US Open boys' singles, this time losing to Fritz in three sets.

Professional

2015: Grand Slam debut
Paul turned pro in 2015. Unusual for an American, Paul has shown a preference for playing on clay, having won the Junior French Open and his first four ITF Futures singles titles on clay. He qualified for the main draw of a major for the first time at the 2015 US Open, losing to Andreas Seppi in the first round.

2016: First top 100 and ATP level win

In March 2016, Paul cracked the top 200 for the first time by qualifying for the Miami Masters. In April, Paul was awarded a wildcard into the 2016 U.S. Men's Clay Court Championships at Houston, and defeated 53rd-ranked Paolo Lorenzi in the first round for his first career ATP level win.

Paul would then mainly compete on the ATP Challenger Tour and ITF Circuit for the remainder of 2016.

2017: First ATP 500 quarterfinal
He continued competing in Challengers and ITFs in first half of 2017.
In July 2017, after going through qualifying at the Atlanta Open, he defeated seventh seed and 53rd-ranked Chung Hyeon in three sets. He then went on to defeat Malek Jaziri in three sets to advance to his first ATP Tour-level quarterfinal. Then he was defeated by third seed Gilles Müller. Following his performance in Atlanta, Tommy was awarded a wildcard into the ATP 500 Washington Open. Paul defeated Casper Ruud to advance to the second round. He then played Lucas Pouille and achieved the biggest win of his career, defeating the Frenchman in straight sets. In the next round, he faced Gilles Müller again, but this time came out on top in three sets to reach his first ATP 500 quarterfinal. He lost to Kei Nishikori in three sets.

2019: Top 100 debut
In September, Paul broke into the top 100 for the first time in his career having won his second ATP Challenger title of the year in New Haven, after winning in Sarasota earlier in the season.

2020: First major third round in singles & quarterfinal in doubles
Paul started his season at the first edition of the Adelaide International. Getting past qualifying, he reached the semifinals where he lost to fellow qualifier Lloyd Harris. Ranked No. 80 at the Australian Open, Paul reached the third round of a Grand Slam for the first time in his career by beating 18th seed and world No. 20, Grigor Dimitrov, in the second round. He was defeated in the third round by Márton Fucsovics.

2021: Top 50 and Olympics debut, first top-5 win, maiden ATP title
Paul started his 2021 season at the Delray Beach Open. Seeded fifth, he lost in the second round to compatriot and eventual finalist, Sebastian Korda. Seeded 15th at the Murray River Open, he was defeated in the second round by Australian Alexei Popyrin. Ranked No. 53 at the Australian Open, he lost in the second round to 24th seed Casper Ruud.

In March, Paul competed at the Rotterdam Open. He reached the quarterfinals where he fell to qualifier and eventual finalist, Márton Fucsovics. At the Abierto Mexicano in Acapulco, he was eliminated in the first round by fourth seed Milos Raonic. In Miami, he was beaten in the first round by Marcos Giron.

Paul started his clay-court season at the Sardegna Open. Seeded eighth, he lost in the first round to Yannick Hanfmann. At the Monte-Carlo Masters, he was defeated in the second round by ninth seed Roberto Bautista Agut. In Madrid, he was ousted from the tournament in the second round by sixth seed and world No. 7, Andrey Rublev. Getting past qualifying at the Italian Open, he lost in the first round to tenth seed Roberto Bautista Agut. At the Lyon Open, he was defeated in the second round by second seed, world No. 5, and eventual champion, Stefanos Tsitsipas. Seeded sixth at the first edition of the Emilia-Romagna Open in Parma, Italy, he reached the semifinals where he lost to Sebastian Korda. Ranked 52 at the French Open, he beat Christopher O'Connell in a first-round five-set thriller before he lost in the second round to world No. 2, Daniil Medvedev. As a result, he entered the top 50 on June 14, 2021.

Paul missed the grass-court season due to a foot injury.

Paul qualified to represent the United States at the 2020 Tokyo Olympics. He lost in the first round to 11th seed Aslan Karatsev of Russia.

Paul started his US Open Series at the Washington Open and lost in the first round to Daniel Elahi Galán. Getting past qualifying at the Canadian Open in Toronto, he was defeated in the second round by tenth seed Roberto Bautista Agut. Making it through qualifying at the Western & Southern Open in Cincinnati, he beat 16th seed, Cristian Garín, in the first round. He was eliminated in the second round by Lorenzo Sonego. Ranked 54 at the US Open, he lost in the first round to Roberto Carballés Baena in four sets.

During the week of September 27, Paul competed at the San Diego Open. He lost in the first round to Sebastian Korda. At the Indian Wells Masters, he recorded one of the biggest wins of his career, defeating fourth seed and world No. 5, Andrey Rublev, to reach the round of 16. Previously, he had never made the third round of an ATP Masters 1000 event. This was his second win against a top 10 opponent after he defeated Alexander Zverev in Acapulco in 2020. He was beaten in the fourth round by 21st seed and eventual champion, Cam Norrie. At the Kremlin Cup in Moscow, he lost in the second round to sixth seed and eventual finalist, Marin Čilić. In St. Petersburg, he was defeated in the second round by fifth seed and eventual finalist, Taylor Fritz. Getting past qualifying at the Paris Masters, he lost in the second round to seventh seed and world No. 10, Hubert Hurkacz. Paul played his final tournament of the season at the Stockholm Open. He reached the first ATP final of his career, defeating fifth seed, Taylor Fritz, in the second round, former world No. 1 and three-time Grand Slam champion, Andy Murray, in the quarterfinals, and eighth seed, Frances Tiafoe, in the semifinals. He won the title, defeating third seed and defending champion, Denis Shapovalov. He became the 10th first-time titleist of the year.

Paul ended the year ranked No. 43.

2022: Two top-3 wins, Wimbledon fourth round, Two Masters quarterfinals & top 30
Paul started his 2022 season at the Adelaide International 1. Seeded sixth, he reached the quarterfinals where he lost to top seed and eventual champion, Gaël Monfils. At the Adelaide International 2, he made it to the quarterfinals where he was defeated by fourth seed Marin Čilić. Ranked No. 41 at the Australian Open, he was eliminated in the second round by Miomir Kecmanović.

Seeded fourth at the Delray Beach Open, Paul reached the semifinals where he fell to top seed Cam Norrie. At the Abierto Mexicano in Acapulco, he won his first-round match when his opponent, world No. 6 and fifth seed Matteo Berrettini, retired due to injury. He was beaten in the quarterfinals by fourth seed, former world No. 1, three-time champion, and eventual champion, Rafael Nadal. Representing the U.S. in the Davis Cup tie against Colombia, Paul played one match and won over Nicolás Mejía. In the end, the USA beat Colombia 4–0 to make up for Colombia beating them last year. At the Indian Wells Masters, he upset world No. 3, Alexander Zverev, in the second round for the biggest win of his career to reach the third round for a second time. He lost in the third round to 29th seed Alex de Minaur. The following week at the Miami Open, he defeated 23rd seed, Karen Khachanov, in the second round to reach the third round for the first time. He was ousted from the tournament in the third round by 11th seed Taylor Fritz. As a result, he reached the top 35 at world No. 34 on 4 April 2022.

Paul started his clay-court season at the U.S. Men's Clay Court Championships in Houston. Seeded seventh, he lost in the second round to Nick Kyrgios. Seeded seventh at the Estoril Open, he was defeated in the first round by 2015 champion Richard Gasquet. In Madrid, he lost in the first round to 10th seed, Jannik Sinner, in a tight three-set match, despite having match points at 5–3 and 6–5 in the second set. At the Italian Open, he was beaten in the second round by Alex de Minaur. Seeded sixth at the Geneva Open, he lost in the first round to Tallon Griekspoor. Seeded 30th at the French Open, he was defeated in the first round by Cristian Garín.

Paul began his grass-court season at the Rosmalen Open in 's-Hertogenbosch. Seeded seventh, he lost in the first round to compatriot Brandon Nakashima in a match that consisted of three tiebreakers. In Queens, he beat sixth seed, Denis Shapovalov, in the first round. In the second round, he defeated three-time Grand Slam champion and former world No. 3, Stan Wawrinka. In the quarterfinals, he lost to second seed, world No. 10, defending champion, and eventual champion, Matteo Berrettini. At the Eastbourne International, he upset second seed and world No. 13, Jannik Sinner, in the second round. He was beaten in the quarterfinals by sixth seed, world No. 24, and defending champion, Alex de Minaur. Seeded 30th at Wimbledon, he defeated Jiří Veselý in the third round to reach the fourth round of a Grand Slam for the first time in his career. He lost in the fourth round to ninth seed, world No. 12, and home crowd favorite, Cameron Norrie.

Paul started his preparation for the US Open at the Atlanta Open. Seeded fifth, he reached the quarterfinals where he lost to Ilya Ivashka. Seeded 14th at the Washington Open, he was defeated in the second round by 2019 champion and eventual champion, Nick Kyrgios. At the Canadian Open, he stunned second seed and world No. 4, Carlos Alcaraz, in the second round, the third top-5 win of his career. He reached the quarterfinals of a Masters 1000 for the first time in his career after defeating 13th seed, Marin Čilić, in the third round. He lost in the quarterfinals to Dan Evans in three sets. Despite the loss, he reached a new career-high of world No. 31 on 15 August 2022. At the Western & Southern Open in Cincinnati, he lost in the second round to Denis Shapovalov in three sets.

Seeded 29th at the 2022 US Open, he reached the third round for the first time at this Major after defeating Bernabé Zapata Miralles and compatriot Sebastian Korda both in five sets matches, the latter lasting over three hours. He lost to 5th seed and eventual finalist Casper Ruud in a third consecutive five set match lasting almost four hours and half hours.

He recorded the biggest win of his career defeating world No. 2 Rafael Nadal in the second round  the 2022 Rolex Paris Masters, his fourth Top-10 victory of the year, recovering from a set and a break down and denying him the No. 1 bid. He went on to defeat Pablo Carreño Busta to reach the quarterfinals for the first time at this tournament, having defeated three Spaniards in a row, including Roberto Bautista Agut in the first round.

Paul ended the year ranked No. 33.

2023: Australian Open semifinal, top 20, 100th career win, First ATP 500 final
Paul made it to the 2023 Australian Open semifinals. On his way Paul defeated Jan-Lennard Struff, 30th seed Alejandro Davidovich Fokina, Jenson Brooksby, and 24th seed Roberto Bautista Agut. He then defeated fellow American Ben Shelton to reach the semifinals, becoming the first American male player to do so at this Major since Andy Roddick in 2009. He fell to eventual champion Novak Djokovic in the semifinals. As a result he reached the top 20 at world No. 19 on 30 January 2023.

He reached his second and biggest career final at the ATP 500 2023 Mexican Open defeating three Americans; Michael Mmoh in the second round for his 100th match career win, Mackenzie McDonald in the quarterfinals and third seed Taylor Fritz in an epic match lasting three and a half hours, setting the record for the longest match in the 30-year history of the tournament. He lost to Alex de Minaur in the final.

Playing style
Paul possesses a strong attacking forehand and solid footwork along the baseline and speed coming into net, attributes that have allowed him success on clay surfaces.

Paul is currently coached by Brad Stine since 2020.

Performance timelines

Singles
Current through the 2023 BNP Paribas Open.

Doubles

ATP career finals

Singles: 2 (1 title, 1 runner-up)

Junior Grand Slam finals

Singles: 2 (1 title, 1 runner-up)

Doubles: 1 (runner-up)

Challenger and Futures finals

Singles: 15 (10–5)

Doubles: 3 (2–1)

Head-to-head records

Record against top 10 players
Paul's record against players who have been ranked in the top 10, with those who are active in boldface. Only ATP Tour main draw matches are considered:

Wins over top 10 players
 He has a  record against players who were, at the time the match was played, ranked in the top 10.

References

External links 
 
 

1997 births
Living people
American male tennis players
People from Voorhees Township, New Jersey
Sportspeople from Boca Raton, Florida
French Open junior champions
Grand Slam (tennis) champions in boys' singles
Olympic tennis players of the United States
Tennis players at the 2020 Summer Olympics
Tennis people from North Carolina
21st-century American people